Thrift store chic refers to a style of dressing where clothes are cheap and/or used. Clothes are often bought from thrift stores such as the Salvation Army, Goodwill, or Value Village. Originally popular among the hippies of the late 1960s, this fashion movement resurfaced during the mid-1980s among teenagers, and expanded into the 1990s with the growing popularity of such music and style influences including the grunge band Nirvana. Thrift store chic can be considered as an anti-fashion statement because it does not follow fashion trends and does not attempt to look expensive or new.

Thrift store chic is often composed of vintage T-shirts (striped tees and anything with vintage graphics, in particular), sweaters, flannel ‘lumberjack’ shirts, and worn and torn jeans. This laid back, nonchalant, and aloof look became fashionable and trendy without attempting to. Originally worn for a variety of reasons, which include an homage, or attempt to resurrect earlier styles, or even in protest to the exploitation of third world child workers in sweat shops.  By the late 2000s many of the younger indie kids wore thrift store clothes primarily for its ironic anti-fashion connotations.

Thrift store chic is also popular among people who enjoy creating their own outfits from pieces of used clothing. This DIY (do-it-yourself) approach creates original articles of clothing that can be very personalized. For example, in the 1986 movie Pretty in Pink, Molly Ringwald’s character, Andie Walsh, is fond of taking clothing from thrift stores and creating a unique and eclectic wardrobe. One very memorable article is the prom dress she creates, made from merging two separate dresses.

During the 1990s, singers such as Kurt Cobain, Courtney Love, and Eddie Vedder promoted the look. Kurt Cobain’s style included uncoordinated and non-brand-name items of clothing  that created the look of a carelessly cool grunge rock star. Clothes often had holes or tears in them and were worn in many layers, which hid the body. Cobain’s modest style contrasted from the aggressive and glamorous style of bands such as Guns N’ Roses. Fans of Nirvana found it easy to emulate his style, thus identifying themselves and the grunge movement. His thrift store style also reflected an ironic stance against corporate culture. 

Entering the 2000s, this look because associated with musical scenes including indie rock and emo gradually spreading to the hipster movement. The hipster movement is popular among people in their 20s and 30s whose style attempts to reject mainstream trends. The hipster movement embraced thrift store chic because of its love for vintage items, especially clothing.  Items that became popular for indie girls included flowery cotton dresses, cardigans, keffiyehs, and eyeglasses chosen deliberately for their unfashionable connotations. Hipster-thrift-store-chic embraces nostalgia and irony by combining old trucker-caps and vintage bowling t-shirts with worn luxury goods like leather jackets, old military dress uniforms as a protest against the war in Iraq, or used business wear, such as tweed cloth sportcoats.

With the stock market crash of 2008, shopping at thrift stores became more widely accepted. Bragging about how much an item of clothing cost was no longer about how expensive it was, but rather how cheap it cost.
Showing off a six-hundred-dollar pair of shoes when people were losing their jobs was no longer tactful. In the United States, resale stores experienced an average of 35% increase in sales. Purchasing used clothing has lost much of its stigma also due to the growing environmental movement towards consumption.

In 2013, the Macklemore and Lewis's single "Thrift Shop" reached number 1 on the U.S. Billboard Hot 100 chart. The song glorifies shopping at thrift shops and denounces expensive brands, such as Gucci, as "getting tricked by a business."

See also
Vintage (design)
Vintage clothing
Mitumba clothing
Garage punk fashion
1970s teenage fashion
1990s in Western fashion
2000s in Western fashion
2010s in Western fashion

References

Fashion aesthetics
1970s fashion
2000s fashion
2010s fashion